Michel Crauste (6 July 1934 – 2 May 2019) was a French international rugby union player. He played as a flanker and number eight for Racing Club de France and FC Lourdes.

Crauste was born in Saint-Laurent-de-Gosse, France. He earned his first cap with the French national team on 19 May 1957 against Romania at Bucharest. He also captained the second French side to beat the Springboks in South Africa and was elected France's Player of the Year in 1961. He was also the first French international player to score three tries in one test match.

Crauste died, aged 84, in Pau, France.

Honours 
 Selected to represent France, 1957–1966
 French rugby champion 1959 with Racing Club de France, 1960 and 1968 with FC Lourdes
 Five Nations Championship 1959 to 1963
 Challenge Yves du Manoir 1966 and 1967

External links
 Michel Crauste International Statistics

French rugby union players
France international rugby union players
1934 births
Rugby union flankers
Rugby union number eights
2019 deaths